Carlos Prates Airport  is one of the airports serving Belo Horizonte, Brazil. It is named after the neighborhood where it is located and this, in turn, was named after an Engineer that planned parts of Belo Horizonte.

It is operated by Infraero.

History
The airport was commissioned in 1944 and it has always been dedicated to general aviation and flying schools. Since 1973 it has been managed by Infraero.

The airport will cease all operations permanently on December 31, 2022, and its operations will be transferred to Carlos Drummond de Andrade Airport.

Airlines and destinations
No scheduled flights operate at this airport.

Access

See also

List of airports in Brazil

References

External links

Airports in Minas Gerais
Airports established in 1944
Buildings and structures in Belo Horizonte
1944 establishments in Brazil